Constantine O'Neale (c.1620 – 1692) was an Irish Jacobite politician. 

O'Neale was the son of Richard Neale of County Wexford. 

On 2 December 1664, O'Neale was made a justice of the peace for County Wexford and in 1667 he was granted estates in New Ross by Charles II of England.  A supporter of James II after the Glorious Revolution, O'Neale was a Member of Parliament for Armagh Borough in the brief Patriot Parliament called by James II in 1689. He died in 1692.

References

Year of birth uncertain
1692 deaths
17th-century Irish people
Irish Jacobites
Irish justices of the peace
Irish MPs 1689
Members of the Parliament of Ireland (pre-1801) for County Armagh constituencies